Georgios Mygas (born 7 April 1994) is a Greek professional footballer who plays as a right-back for Super League club Ionikos.

Career
Mygas began his career with the youth club of Panetolikos. He made his first-team debut on 29 September 2012, playing against Kalloni for the 2012–13 Greek Football League. 

On 27 May 2016, Panetolikos extended the player's contract which expired in the summer of 2017. 

On 7 January 2019, Zagłębie Sosnowiec announced the signing for a six months' period of the Greek defender, as club's coach Valdas Ivanauskas convinced of a long list of the player's strengths like good reception, effective one-on-one game, speed, dynamics, precise centering in full gear and unforced offensive qualities.

On 26 June 2021, Ionikos officially announced the signing of the greek defender on a free transfer.

Career statistics

References

External links 
 Profile at Panetolikos.gr
 

1994 births
Living people
Greek footballers
Greek expatriate footballers
Greece youth international footballers
Greece under-21 international footballers
Expatriate footballers in Poland
Panetolikos F.C. players
Levadiakos F.C. players
Ionikos F.C. players
Football League (Greece) players
Super League Greece 2 players
Super League Greece players
Association football fullbacks
Footballers from Amfilochia